Hanif (Arabic: حنيف, Hebrew: חניף) is an Arabic masculine given name, which means a righteous person or a true believer. The origin of the word is uncertain, although it is generally agreed that it is derived from the Classical Syriac ‎ (ḥanpā, “pagan, impious”).

Etymology
It is generally agreed that the word Ḥanīf (plural: ḥunafā') is derived from the Classical Syriac ‎ (ḥanpā, “pagan, impious”). However, there is no credible theory which can explain the transformation of the term's meaning – from heathen to monotheist. Nabataeans used Hanif's cognate to designate a follower of Hellenized religion. And Nabataean is generally considered as the region where the transformation of the term's meaning took place.

Alfred Felix Landon Beeston argues that the ambiguity associated with the shift of the term's meaning can be largely removed if one assumes that the term was introduced via Najran, instead of its direct introduction from Syria. He argues that the Najranites had adopted the term hanpe from the Syrian missionaries, who used it for all non-Christians, irrespective of them being polytheist or monotheist. The 5th century inhabitants of Mecca had strong trading ties with the Yemen, where the wealthier classes were overwhelmingly monotheist. And, as the Najranites used the term Ḥanīf to designate the Yemenis, it would have been easier for the Meccans to adopt it in the sense of monotheism.

Notable people
Notable people with the given name Hanif include:
 Hanif Abbasi (born 1966), Pakistani politician and businessman
 Hanif Awan (born 1952), Pakistani politician
 Hanif Baktash (1961–2011), Pashto poet and writer
 Hanif Bali (born 1987), Swedish politician
 Hanif Dzahir (born 1994), Malaysian footballer
 Hanif Hamir (born 1997), Bruneian footballer 
 Hanif Kara, British structural engineer
 Hanif Khan (born 1959), Pakistani field hockey player
 Hanif Khan Pitafi, Pakistani politician
 Hanif Kureishi (born 1954), British author, playwright, and filmmaker
 Hanif Lalani (born 1962), British business executive
 Hanif Mohammad (1934–2016), Pakistani cricketer
 Hanif Omranzadeh (born 1985), Iranian footballer
 Hanif Pashteen (born 1992), Pashtun human rights activist
 Hanif Ramay (1930–2006), Pakistani politician
 Hanif Sanket (born 1958), Bangladeshi television host
 Hanif Shah al-Hussaini, Afghan politician
 Hanif-ur-Rehman (born 1976), Pakistani cricketer
 Hanif Willis-Abdurraqib (born 1983), American poet and  music critic
 Muhammad Hanif Dhakiri (born 1972), 26th Minister of Manpower of Indonesia

See also
 Hanif
 Hanifa (disambiguation)

References

Arabic masculine given names